Lasic may refer to:

 LASIK, laser eye surgery
 Lasić, Slavic surname
 Đorđije Lašić, Yugoslav Army officer
 Lasix, a diuretic medication

See also 
 Lassic, 19th-century indigenous American leader
 Lassik (disambiguation)